Craig Borten (born September 16, 1965) is an American screenwriter. Borten is best known for his Oscar-nominated script for the 2013 film Dallas Buyers Club. In addition to his nomination for Academy Award for Best Original Screenplay, Borten also received a nomination for Writers Guild of America Award for Best Original Screenplay.

Biography
Borten grew up in Pennsylvania, where he attended Plymouth Whitemarsh High School, then attended Syracuse University in New York and subsequently moved to Los Angeles to pursue a career in filmmaking.

After hearing about Ron Woodroof, the original founder of the "Dallas Buyers Club" for the distribution of unapproved HIV medications, in the early 1990s, and interviewing Woodroof in 1992, Borten decided to write a screenplay about Woodroof and his buyers club. He successfully sold the script—titled Dallas Buyers Club—in 1996 with Woody Harrelson attached to play Ron and Dennis Hopper Directing, but shortly afterwards the production company that had bought it dissolved. In 2001, he rewrote the script with Melisa Wallack and they sold it to Universal Studios, with Marc Forster to direct the film and Brad Pitt to star. Again, the production fell through, which Borten described as "a death blow".  In 2009, however, Borten and Wallack were able to reclaim their rights to the script and producer Robbie Brenner was able to cast Matthew McConaughey and secure funding for the film's production. The film was released in 2013, more than two decades after Borten met Woodroof, and more than 15 years after selling his first version of the script. Dallas Buyers Club received numerous accolades, including Academy Award nominations for Best Picture and Best Original Screenplay.

Borten's screenwriting credits since 2013 include other biopics such as the survival-drama The 33 and the Netflix film Sergio.  

His upcoming projects include The War and Treaty with John Legend and Gilbert Films, and Titan: The Life of John D. Rockefeller, a biopic about the life of John D. Rockefeller with Lasse Hallström attached as director.

References

External links

American male screenwriters
Living people
Syracuse University alumni
1965 births
Screenwriters from Pennsylvania
Screenwriters from New York (state)